Banco de Costa Rica (BCR) is a state-owned commercial bank that operates in Costa Rica.  With an equity of $806,606,710  and assets of $7,607,483,881, the bank has established itself as one of the strongest banking companies in both Costa Rica and Central America.

The bank began primarily as a private commercial bank until it was designated a currency issuer and exclusive manager of public revenues in the last decade of the 19th century. After the bank nationalization decree of 1948, Banco de Costa Rica became a financial entity with a major role in the development of the country.

References 

Banks established in 1877
Banks of Costa Rica
1877 establishments in Costa Rica